Shlomi Moshe Ohayon (born May 24, 1983) is an Israeli former professional football midfielder who serves as assistant manager of F.C. Ashdod.

Club career
Ohayon was born in Ashdod. After six years in Israel, he moved at 2006 to the Swiss club Winterthur. He did not count as a foreign player in Switzerland because he is in possession of a French passport.

In the season 2007–08 in January, he transferred from F.C Winterthur to F.C Ashdod in the Israeli Premier League and helped it avoid relegation to the second league in Israel. In 15 games he scored 4 goals and made two assists.

In June 2008, Ohayon signed a three-year contract with Israeli Champions and Cup Holders Beitar Jerusalem. On January 21, he signed a 2.5-year contract with F.C. Ashdod.

On July 27, 2011, Ohayon signed a one-year contract with the Polish club Legia Warsaw with an option to extend it for another two years.

On January 9, 2012, Ohayon signed a one-year contract with the Swiss club FC Luzern with an option to extend it for another year. On February 5, 2012, Ohayon played his first game with FC Luzern. On March 4, 2011, Ohayon scored his first goal for Luzern, the equalizer in a 3–1 defeat against FC Basel at St. Jakob-Park.

On September 21, 2014, he signed with Hapoel Tel Aviv.

International career
Ohayon made his debut for the Israel national football team against Croatia on October 13, 2007.

Honors

Club
FC Luzern
Swiss Super League: runner-up 2011–12
Swiss Cup: runner-up 2012

Legia Warsaw
Polish Cup: 2011–12

References

External links
 
 
 
 Profile and statistics of Moshe Ohayon on One.co.il 

1983 births
Living people
Israeli Jews
Israeli footballers
F.C. Ashdod players
FC Winterthur players
Beitar Jerusalem F.C. players
Legia Warsaw players
FC Luzern players
Anorthosis Famagusta F.C. players
Hapoel Tel Aviv F.C. players
Israeli Premier League players
Ekstraklasa players
Cypriot First Division players
Swiss Super League players
Liga Leumit players
Israel international footballers
Israel under-21 international footballers
Israel youth international footballers
Israeli expatriate footballers
Expatriate footballers in Poland
Expatriate footballers in Cyprus
Expatriate footballers in Switzerland
Israeli expatriate sportspeople in Poland
Israeli expatriate sportspeople in Cyprus
Israeli expatriate sportspeople in Switzerland
Recipients of Prime Minister's Prize for Hebrew Literary Works
Association football midfielders
Footballers from Ashdod
Israeli people of Moroccan-Jewish descent